Oplerclanis is a genus of moths in the family Sphingidae first described by Ulf Eitschberger in 2007.

Species
Oplerclanis boisduvali (Aurivillius, 1898)
Oplerclanis rhadamistus (Fabricius, 1781)

References

Smerinthini
Moth genera